Suzanne "Suzy" Powell-Roos (born September 3, 1976) is an American discus thrower. She competed at the 1996, 2000 and 2008 Olympics with the best result of 15th place in 2000.

She holds the American record at 222 ft 0 in (67.67 m), which she set on March 14, 2007 in Wailuku, Maui, Hawaii at the "Big Wind" Discus Challenge. She set the world's best year performance in 2002, with a throw of 69.44 meters at the University of California, San Diego on April 27, 2002, the best throw in the world since 1999. That throw was not ratified as the American record due to technical issues with the throwing sector.

While in high school at Thomas Downey High School in 1994 she was named the national Girl's "High School Athlete of the Year" by Track and Field News after setting the National High School Record in the discus at 214' 0"  As a sophomore, she was on the American team at the IAAF World Junior Championships, finishing tenth.  Two years later she took home a bronze medal from the same event.  She was the 1995 Pan American Junior Championships gold medalist.  She later attended UCLA.  She won the 1996 and 2007 USA Outdoor Track and Field Championships (1996 while winning the United States Olympic Trials (track and field).  She was the runner up six times.

Achievements

References

External links
 Suzy Powell-Roos at USATF
 
 
 California State Records before 2000

1976 births
Living people
Sportspeople from Modesto, California
Track and field athletes from California
American female discus throwers
Olympic track and field athletes of the United States
Athletes (track and field) at the 1996 Summer Olympics
Athletes (track and field) at the 2000 Summer Olympics
Athletes (track and field) at the 2008 Summer Olympics
Pan American Games track and field athletes for the United States
Athletes (track and field) at the 2003 Pan American Games
UCLA Bruins women's track and field athletes
World Athletics Championships athletes for the United States